2V or 2-V may refer to:

2V, IATA code for Amtrak
2V angle, curved isogyre differences in a conoscopic interference pattern in optical crystallography
P-2V, a model of Lockheed P-2 Neptune
An-2V, a model of Antonov An-2
2V (V-69), manufacturer's designation for Venera 5 spacecraft
2VLY, call sign for Power FM 98.1

See also
V2 (disambiguation)